Provisional Administration (Polish Administracja Zastępcza) was one of the branches of the Department of Internal Affairs of the Government Delegate’s Office at Home in Poland during World War II.

It was created in 1940 as a joint initiative of the Headquarters of the Armia Krajowa and the Delegate's Office. It was a kind of shadow administration prepared for the moment of either liberation of Poland or the start of an all-national armed uprising.

It was based on the Polish pre-war administrative division, composed of three grades (voivodeship-powiat-gmina), combined with the pre-war military division. In August 1943 the division of competences between the army and the civilian authorities was agreed. The organization of the Provisional Administration was later accepted by the President of Poland on April 26, 1944.

In 1944 during Operation Tempest, as the sole representatives of the legitimate Polish government, the members of the Provisional Administration took power from the withdrawing German troops and welcomed the advancing Red Army . However, most of them were arrested by the NKVD and either sent to Russia for interrogation, sent to the GULag or killed on the spot.

1940 establishments in Poland
Military history of Poland during World War II
Poland in World War II